My Romance is an album by jazz pianist Chris Anderson which was recorded in 1960 but not released on the Vee-Jay label until 1983.

Track listing
 "Wrap Your Troubles in Dreams"  (Harry Barris, Ted Koehler, Billy Moll) - 3:28
 "So in Love" (Cole Porter) - 4:23
 "You Stepped Out of a Dream" (Nacio Herb Brown, Gus Kahn) - 6:21
 "Soon" (George Gershwin, Ira Gershwin) - 2:44
 "Monica" (Bill Lee) - 2:38
 "A Fellow Needs a Girl" (Richard Rodgers, Oscar Hammerstein II) - 3:07
 "I Could Write a Book" (Rodgers, Lorenz Hart) - 3:50
 "My Romance" (Rodgers, Hart) - 5:18
 "Love Letters" (Victor Young, Edward Heyman) - 7:01

Personnel
Chris Anderson - piano
Bill Lee - bass
Art Taylor - drums

References

1983 albums
Chris Anderson (pianist) albums
Vee-Jay Records albums